WYOT (102.3 FM, "102.3 The Coyote") is a radio station broadcasting a country music format. Licensed to Rochelle, Illinois, the station serves the Rochelle and DeKalb areas. The station is owned by Rochelle Broadcasting Company.

Programming
The Coyote's programming includes Kris Wexell with Chuck O'Brien and Jeff Leon weekday mornings, Susan Tyler weekday afternoons, as well as nationally syndicated shows such as The Sandy Show, Nights With Elaina, The Big Time Saturday Night, American Country Countdown, Country Top 30 With Bobby Bones and The Sam Alex Show .

History
The station began broadcasting on October 5, 1973, holding the call sign WRHL-FM, and was a sister station to WRHL 1060. The station initially simulcast the country music programming of WRHL 1060. In 1994, the station's format was changed to adult contemporary, and the station was branded "The Hub". In 2006, the station's format was changed to adult hits, and the station was branded "102.3 Sam-FM". The station aired programming from Dial Global's S.A.M.: Simply About Music, along with local programming.

The Coyote
In December 2012, the station's format was changed to country music, and the station was branded "102.3 The Coyote". In 2015, the station's call sign was changed to WYOT. 102.3 The Coyote was named "Small Business of the Year" by the Rochelle Chamber of Commerce in 2014. In May 2014, Kris Wexell was recognized by the 98th General Assembly of Illinois for his work with The Coyote. The Coyote was also named the Illinois National Guard's Small Market Station of the Year for 2014. In 2016, 2017, and 2018, Kris Wexell was named by the Illinois Broadcasters Association (IBA), Illinois Radio Personality of the Year for small market, also placing 2nd for Best Morning Show in 2014 and 1st place in 2019, 2020 & 2021. WYOT was also named as one of the Top 3 radio stations in the state of Illinois by the IBA in 2020.

The Coyote also produces a country oldies show called "Country Hits USA" the show airs Sunday's 9am-Noon. 102.3 The Coyote also is a reporter for Mediabase, Music Row Country Breakout™ Chart & CDX TRACtion Weekly Chart.

102.3 The Coyote (WYOT-FM) was named 2022 Station of the Year for Small Market in the State of Illinois by the Illinois Broadcasters Association.

References

External links
WYOT's website

YOT
Country radio stations in the United States
Radio stations established in 1973
1973 establishments in Illinois